Your Deal, My Lovely is a 1941 thriller novel by the British writer Peter Cheyney. It is the seventh in his series of novels featuring the FBI agent Lemmy Caution. Much of the action takes place in wartime London. Caution is called in to investigate the disappearance of a prominent scientist.

Film adaptation
It was made into a 1963 French film Your Turn, Darling directed by Bernard Borderie and starring Eddie Constantine, Gaia Germani and Guy Delorme. It was part of a group of French adaptations of Cheyney novels, whose works were very popular in the country.

References

Bibliography
 Goble, Alan. The Complete Index to Literary Sources in Film. Walter de Gruyter, 1999.
 Hutton, Margaret-Anne. French Crime Fiction, 1945–2005: Investigating World War II. Routledge, 2016.
 James, Russell. Great British Fictional Detectives. Remember When, 21 Apr 2009.
 Reilly, John M. Twentieth Century Crime & Mystery Writers. Springer, 2015.
 Pitts, Michael R. Famous Movie Detectives. Scarecrow Press, 1979.

William Collins, Sons books
1941 British novels
Novels by Peter Cheyney
British thriller novels
Novels set in London
British crime novels
British novels adapted into films